Ekderwa is a census town in East Champaran district in the Indian state of Bihar.

Geography 
Ederwa is located near a sub divisional town Raxaul Bihar, three kilometers west of the railway station of Raxaul.

Demographics
 India census, Ekderwa had a population of 1060 . Males constitute 53% of the population and females 47%.  In Ekderwa, 12% of the population is under 6 years of age.

References

Villages in East Champaran district